The Solapur district is under proposal to be divided and a separate Pandharpur District be carved out of existing Solapur district, comprising talukas of Pandharpur, Sangole, Karmala, Mangalwedha, Malshiras and Madha in Solapur District and also talukas of Jath and Atpadi from neighboring Sangli district, to create a new Pandharpur district.

Solapur district
Proposed districts in Maharashtra
Pune division